The Chatterley Affair is a BBC television drama, produced by BBC Wales and broadcast on BBC Four on 20 March 2006. It is a semi-fictitious account of the obscenity trial surrounding the publication of D. H. Lawrence's 1928 novel Lady Chatterley's Lover in 1960. Written by Andrew Davies and directed by James Hawes, it draws heavily, and accurately, on the court reporter's notes (published by Penguin as The Trial of Lady Chatterley) for scenes that take place within the courtroom but also presents entirely fictitious scenes involving the deliberations of jury members. These were, like all jury deliberations under English law, unmonitored when they took place.

The Chatterley Affair stars Louise Delamere and Rafe Spall as two fictional jurors who become lovers during the course of the trial; their brief relationship taking, and reflecting aspects of, the novel's own narrative and themes. The script chooses to invert the novel's central conceit by showing a relationship between a worldly woman and a naive man, rather than the other way around.

Also portrayed are numerous real-life participants in the trial, such as judge Mr Justice Byrne (played here by Karl Johnson), prosecutor Mervyn Griffith-Jones (Pip Torrens), defence lawyer Gerald Gardiner (Donald Sumpter) and sociologist Richard Hoggart (David Tennant).

Critical reception 
Nancy Banks-Smith of The Guardian gave the film a positive review.

References

External links
 The Chatterley Affair at bbc.co.uk
 The Chatterley Affair – BBC programme page
 
 Article from The Times

Adultery in television
BBC television dramas
British television films
British courtroom films
Films scored by Nicholas Hooper
Films about freedom of expression
Films set in 1960
Films set in London
Films directed by James Hawes